Henry Jupp (christened 6 August 1802) was an English first-class cricketer who played two first-class matches during the 1820s. In 1824, he played for Godalming Cricket Club against MCC at Lord's, scoring 2 runs in his sole innings. In 1827, Jupp played for All-England against Sussex at Darnall New Ground in the first of the roundarm trial matches, scoring 0 not out and 20.

References

English cricketers
English cricketers of 1787 to 1825
Godalming Cricket Club cricketers
Non-international England cricketers
1802 births
Year of death unknown